Fujian Circuit, also translated as Fujian Province, was one of the major circuits during the Tang and Song dynasties of imperial China. Its administrative area corresponds to roughly the modern Chinese province of Fujian.

History

The Tang-era Fujian Circuit was renamed Wuwei in 896.

List of governors

Tang

 ...
 Chen Yan (884–891)
 Wang Chao (891–896)

Song

 ...

See also
 Qingyuan Jiedushi, an administrative circuit in the area created under Southern Tang that briefly remained nominally independent as well under Song

References

Bibliography 
 
 

Circuits of the Song dynasty
985 establishments
10th-century establishments in China
1278 disestablishments in Asia
13th-century disestablishments in China
Former circuits in Fujian